Leachia cyclura is a species of cephalopods belonging to the family Cranchiidae.

The species is found in Northern America.

References

Squid